Tsvetan Varsanov (born 20 June 1991) is a Bulgarian footballer who currently plays as a midfielder for Pirin Razlog. He had previously played for Pirin Razlog, Pirin Blagoevgrad, Botev Vratsa, Montana and Bansko.

References

External links

Living people
1991 births
Bulgarian footballers
Association football midfielders
FC Pirin Razlog players
OFC Pirin Blagoevgrad players
FC Botev Vratsa players
FC Montana players
FC Bansko players
First Professional Football League (Bulgaria) players